Kolomna Kremlin is a very large fortress in Kolomna, Russia. The stone Kolomna Kremlin was built from 1525–1531 under the Russian Tsar Vasily III. Before its reconstruction in 1531, the Kolomna Kremlin was made of wood. On its territory there are many Russian churches and monasteries: The Uspensky cathedral, the Voskresenky church, the Spassky monastery (14th century), and a number of others.

Architectural features 
There is a version that construction of the Kolomna Kremlin was headed by Italian architect Aleviz Friazin, who participated in the construction of walls and towers of the Moscow Kremlin and took it as an example for the construction of the Kolomna Kremlin. This is indicated, for example, by the construction period of the Kolomna Kremlin. The Kremlin was built six years, which indicates that builders of the fortress had a great experience because comparable in scale construction in the capital lasted more than ten years.

The Kolomna Kremlin, as well as fortresses of other Russian towns of that period (Veliky Novgorod, Ivangorod, Nizhny Novgorod, Zaraisk and Tula), has Italian features. Fortification forms of northern Italian fortresses, such as Turin, Milan, Verona were repeated. Besides general construction methods and Italian architectural details, such as machicolations - loopholes in towers, combat parapet with dovetail-shaped merlons, faceted towers of the main fence, diversionary towers. There are other features of similarity of Moscow and Kolomna Kremlins.

Walls of Kolomna Kremlin, despite a certain archaism of fortress architecture of that time, were created not only to resist assaults by manpower but to defend with cannon. The towers and walls of the fortress were full of embrasures. The embrasures themselves are designed for the placement of firearms, have a characteristic shape of embrasures - a socket, and at times, they are overlapped by vaults. The embrasures of the towers give a good view of the adjoining parts of the walls and the castle moat.

Buildings of the Kolomna Kremlin

The Kolomna kremlin once had 17 towers, four of which had gates, with the main gates being located at the northern and southern end of the complex. Only 7 towers and two parts of the wall have survived.

Here is a list of the towers (towers marked as gates means that a gate was running underneath it):
 Pyatnitskie Gates
 Kolomenskaya Tower
 Granovitaya Tower
 Yamskaya Tower
 Simionovskaya Tower
 Spasskaya Tower
 Pogorelaya Tower
 Voznesenskaya Tower
 Ivanovskie Gates
 Borisobglebskaya Tower
 Kosie Gates
 Voskresenskaya Tower
 Sandirevskaya Tower
 Bobretsevskaya Tower
 Vodynie Gates
 Sviblova Tower
 Zastenochnaya Tower

Besides towers, there were two gates in walls: The Mihaelovskie Gates and the Melynychnie Gates

Statistics

References

Kolomna
Buildings and structures in Moscow Oblast
Kremlins
Cultural heritage monuments of federal significance in Moscow Oblast